Chorzelów  is a village in the administrative district of Gmina Mielec, within Mielec County, Subcarpathian Voivodeship, in south-eastern Poland.

The village has a population of 2,728.

Climate
Chorzelów has a humid continental climate (Köppen Dfb).

References

Villages in Mielec County